Shelly Oberoi is an Indian politician who is serving as Mayor of Municipal Corporation of Delhi since 2022.

Oberoi became the first mayor elected after re-unification of the Municipal Corporation of North, South and East Delhi into a unified Municipal Corporation of Delhi.

Early life and career
Shelly Oberoi was born in 1983. She has done PhD in management from Indira Gandhi National Open University, studied management from Indian Institute of Management, Kozhikode, Bachelor of Commerce from Janki Devi Memorial College and Master of Commerce from Himachal Pradesh University. She has served as an assistant visiting professor at Delhi University.

Political career
Oberoi joined Aam Aadmi Party, Delhi in 2013 and became the Vice President of its women’s wing in 2021. She won 2022 Delhi Municipal Corporation election from Ward 86 which comes under Patel Nagar Assembly constituency. On 23 December 2023, she became mayoral candidate.
She was elected as the Mayor of Delhi on 22nd Feb, 2023, winning by 34 votes against the BJP candidate Rekha Gupta.

References

Delhi University alumni
Indian politicians
Indian women in politics
Aam Aadmi Party politicians
Aam Aadmi Party politicians from Delhi
1983 births
Living people